was a town located in Kinosaki District, Hyōgo Prefecture, Japan.

, the district of Hidaka has an estimated population of 17,242. 

On April 1, 2005, Hidaka, along with the towns of Kinosaki and Takeno (all from Kinosaki District), and the towns of Izushi and Tantō (both from Izushi District), was merged into the expanded city of Toyooka and no longer exists as an independent municipality.

References

External links
 Official website of Toyooka 

Dissolved municipalities of Hyōgo Prefecture
Toyooka, Hyōgo